The Leslie-Rolen House is a historic house at Cherry and High Streets in Leslie, Arkansas.  It is a -story wood-frame structure, with a simplified vernacular interpretation of Queen Anne styling.  It has a complex roofline typical of the style, with cross gables and gable dormers projecting from a nominally hipped roof.  Its front porch is supported by spindled turned posts.  The house was built in 1907 by Sam Leslie.

The house was listed on the National Register of Historic Places in 1993.

See also
National Register of Historic Places listings in Searcy County, Arkansas

References

Houses on the National Register of Historic Places in Arkansas
Houses completed in 1907
Houses in Searcy County, Arkansas
National Register of Historic Places in Searcy County, Arkansas